The Misadventures of Sheriff Lobo is an American action comedy television series that ran on NBC from September 18, 1979, to May 5, 1981. For its second season the show was renamed Lobo. The program aired Tuesday nights, at 8:00p.m. Eastern time. The lead character, Sheriff Elroy P. Lobo, played by Claude Akins, was a spin-off character from B. J. and the Bear, which also aired on NBC from 1979-1981.

Synopsis
In fictitious Orly County, Georgia, Sheriff Lobo is the lead enforcer of the law — as well as one of its leading offenders. The pilot of The Misadventures of Sheriff Lobo aired as an episode of BJ and the Bear titled "Lobo", which set the premise for the show and introduced the main cast of characters that would be involved in the show. 

The corrupt (but now somewhat reformed) sheriff is assisted in his schemes by Deputy Perkins (Mills Watson), whose buffoonery often upsets and exacerbates the situation. An honest but naive new deputy, Birdwell "Birdie" Hawkins (Brian Kerwin), who is unaware of Lobo's schemes, has joined the force and has become one of Lobo's deputies. 

Birdie often refers to Lobo as his "Hero" and compares him to Wyatt Earp — "a little rough around the edges, but a good lawman." At first this baffles Lobo — to think that someone actually thinks highly of him in any way — but it begins to make Lobo feel proud and boosts his self-esteem. This always annoys and infuriates Deputy Perkins, who usually sneers at Birdie and mutters, "I'm gonna have to get that boy!" 

Other characters in the show are Perkins' wife (and Lobo's sister) Rose Lobo Perkins (Cydney Crampton); waitress Margaret Ellen (Janet Lynn Curtis); resort owner Sarah Cumberland (Leann Hunley); bank president and Lobo's former "partner in crime" Harry Cunningham (Dennis Burkley); and district attorney Alexander Waverly (Ben Cooper).

The show was an obvious clone of CBS's hit comedy/drama The Dukes of Hazzard, right down to the rural Georgia setting and the shiftiness of its lead character.  Lobo — 
seemingly a cross between Hazzard County's Boss Hogg and Sheriff Rosco P. Coltrane — was a small-time wheeler-dealer, always looking to make a quick buck. But when serious crime threatened Orly County and its people, Lobo would do his job capably and uphold the law. Unlike Hogg or Coltrane, Lobo was portrayed as an intelligent man and an able police officer.

The series premise was overhauled completely as  Season 2 began in 1980. The governor of Georgia — impressed by Orly County's low crime rate (because Lobo forgot to send the crime data to the state capitol) — reassigns Lobo and Deputies Perkins and Birdie to his crime-fighting task force, the Special Crimes Action Team (SCAT) in Atlanta. Lobo now reports to Chief J.C. Carson (Nicolas Coster). Lobo is forced to contend with his new co-workers, Detectives Peaches (Amy Botwinick) and Brandy (Tara Buckman). The new format also included Nell Carter (billed as Nell Ruth Carter) as Sgt. Hildy Jones. 

In a July 1980 interview with The New York Times, NBC president Fred Silverman said research showed the show performing well in rural areas but not as well in urban areas. Silverman had a history of preference for urban viewers over rural ones that dated all the way back to 1970. (See the rural purge for an example). For that reason, it had been decided to move the show from rural Orly County to urban Atlanta. But the series was less successful with the new format, and it was cancelled after the end of its second season.

The theme song for the show's first season was sung by Frankie Laine and was written in a western ballad style that depicted Lobo as more of a hero than an offender. During the second season, the theme song was a version of Georgia on My Mind.

Cast
 Claude Akins as Sheriff Elroy P. Lobo
 Mills Watson as Deputy Perkins
 Brian Kerwin as Deputy Birdwell "Birdie" Hawkins
 Cydney Crampton as Rose Lobo Perkins
 Janet Lynn Curtis as Margaret Ellen
 Leann Hunley as Sarah Cumberland
 Dennis Burkley as Harry Cunningham
 Nell Carter as Sergeant Hildy Jones
 Nicolas Coster as Chief J.C. Carson
 Amy Botwinick as Peaches
 Tara Buckman as Brandy

Episodes

Season 1 (1979–80)

Season 2 (1980–81)

Syndication
The series was syndicated in the early 1980s, as "The B.J./Lobo Show". For syndication, Universal offered the show in two versions, one was the original 60 minute format and the other had episodes cut to fit a half-hour time slot from their original hour versions. What differentiated the half hour episodes from the hour long ones was the inclusion of a laugh track.

References

External links 
 
 

1979 American television series debuts
1981 American television series endings
1970s American sitcoms
1980s American sitcoms
1970s American workplace comedy television series
1980s American workplace comedy television series
American action comedy television series
American television spin-offs
English-language television shows
NBC original programming
Television series by Universal Television
Television series created by Glen A. Larson
Television shows set in Georgia (U.S. state)